Irina Nekrassova (born 1 March 1988) is a female weightlifter from Kazakhstan.

Career
At the 2007 World Weightlifting Championships she ranked 9th in the 69 kg category, lifting 228 kg in total.

She initially won the silver medal in the 63 kg category at the 2008 Summer Olympics, with 240 kg in total. On 17 November 2016 the IOC disqualified her from the 2008 Olympic Games, stripped her Olympic medal and struck her results from the record for failing a drugs test in a re-analysis of her doping sample from 2008.

References

External links
 Athlete Biography at beijing2008

Living people
1988 births
Competitors stripped of Summer Olympics medals
Kazakhstani female weightlifters
Olympic weightlifters of Kazakhstan
Weightlifters at the 2008 Summer Olympics
Weightlifters at the 2006 Asian Games
Doping cases in weightlifting
Kazakhstani sportspeople in doping cases
Asian Games competitors for Kazakhstan
20th-century Kazakhstani women
21st-century Kazakhstani women